Serwitut  German: Servitut, is a village in the administrative district of Gmina Strzeleczki, within Krapkowice County, Opole Voivodeship, in south-western Poland.

References

Serwitut